Laurence Michael Dillon (born Laura Maud Dillon; 1 May 1915 – 15 May 1962) was a physician and the first trans man to undergo phalloplasty.

Early life and transition
Dillon was the second child of Robert Arthur Dillon (1865–1925), heir to the baronetcy of Lismullen in Ireland, and his Australian wife, Laura Maud McCliver,  Reese. Dillon's mother died of sepsis ten days after giving birth. Dillon, assigned female at birth, was raised with older brother Bobby by their two aunts in Folkestone in Kent, England. He grew up in the Church of England.

Dillon was educated at Brampton Down School, then at St Anne's College, Oxford, a women's college. Dillon was president of the Oxford University Women's Boat Club and won a blue for rowing, competing in the Women's Boat Race in 1935 and 1936. After graduating he took a job at a research laboratory in Bristol.

Dillon was more comfortable in men's clothing and was more self-assured living as a male. In 1939, he sought treatment from George Foss, who had been experimenting with testosterone to treat excessive menstrual bleeding; at the time, the hormone's masculinizing effects were poorly understood. Foss provided Dillon with testosterone pills but insisted Dillon consult a psychiatrist first, who gossiped about Dillon's desire to become a man, and soon the story was all over town. Dillon fled to Bristol and took a job at a garage. The hormones soon made it possible for him to pass as male, and eventually the garage manager insisted that other employees refer to Dillon as "he" in order to avoid confusing customers. Dillon was promoted to recovery-vehicle driver and doubled as a fire watcher during the Blitz.

Dillon suffered from hypoglycemia, and twice injured his head in falls when he passed out from low blood sugar. While in the Bristol Royal Infirmary recovering from the second of these attacks, he came to the attention of one of the world's few practitioners of plastic surgery. The surgeon performed a double mastectomy, provided Dillon with a doctor's note that enabled him to change his birth certificate, and put him in contact with the pioneering plastic surgeon Harold Gillies.  He officially became Laurence Michael Dillon in 1944 when the birth certificate was amended; this meant that he was now heir presumptive to the baronetcy. Dillon was one of the few transgender people able legally to change his identity at this time; in 1970 the marriage of April Ashley, a trans woman, was declared null in the court case Corbett v Corbett, and thenceforth change of sex would not be legally recognized. 

Gillies had previously reconstructed penises for injured soldiers and performed surgery on intersex people with ambiguous genitalia. He was willing to perform a phalloplasty, but not immediately; the constant influx of wounded soldiers from World War II already kept him in the operating room around the clock. In 1945 Dillon enrolled in School of Medicine at Trinity College Dublin under his new legal name, Laurence Michael Dillon. A former tutor of Dillon's persuaded the Oxford registrar to alter records to show that he had graduated from all-male Brasenose rather than the women's college St Anne's, so that his academic transcript would not raise questions. Again he became a distinguished rower, this time for the men's boat club.

Gillies performed at least thirteen surgeries on Dillon between 1946 and 1949. He officially diagnosed Dillon with acute hypospadias in order to conceal that he was performing sex-reassignment surgery. Dillon, still a medical student at Trinity, blamed war injuries when infections caused a temporary limp. In what little free time he had he enjoyed dancing, but he avoided forming close relationships with women, for fear of exposure and in the belief that "One must not lead a girl on if one could not give her children."  He deliberately cultivated a misogynist reputation to prevent any such problematic attachments.

Self and Roberta Cowell
In 1946 Dillon published Self: A Study in Ethics and Endocrinology, a book about what would now be called transsexualism, though that term would not be introduced into the English language until 1949, when David Oliver Cauldwell introduced the word directly based on Magnus Hirschfeld's coinage (in German) of the term  in 1923. Dillon described "masculine inverts" as being born with "the mental outlook and temperament of the other sex", using Stephen Gordon in the novel The Well of Loneliness as an example. Since this form of inversion was innate, a hidden physical condition similar to intersex, it could not be affected by psychoanalysis and should instead be treated medically. "Where the mind cannot be made to fit the body," he wrote, "the body should be made to fit, approximately at any rate, to the mind."

Self brought him to the attention of Roberta Cowell, who would become the first British trans woman to receive male-to-female sex reassignment surgery. Though Dillon was not yet a licensed physician, he performed an orchiectomy on Cowell, since British law made the operation illegal. Cowell's vaginoplasty was later performed by Gillies.

Later life
Dillon qualified as a physician in 1951 and initially worked in a Dublin hospital. He then spent the six years at sea as a naval surgeon for P&O and the China Navigation Company.

Dillon had not revealed his own history in Self, but it came to light in 1958 as an indirect result of his aristocratic background. Debrett's Peerage, a genealogical guide, listed him as heir to his brother's baronetcy, while its competitor Burke's Peerage mentioned only a sister, Laura Maude . When the discrepancy was noticed, he told the press he was a male born with a severe form of hypospadias and had undergone a series of operations to correct the condition. The editor of Debrett's told Time magazine that Dillon was unquestionably next in line for the baronetcy: "I have always been of the opinion that a person has all rights and privileges of the sex that is, at a given moment, recognized."

The unwanted press attention led Dillon to flee to India, where he spent time with Sangharakshita (Dennis Lingwood) in Kalimpong, and with the Buddhist community in Sarnath. While at Sarnath, Dillon decided to pursue ordination and became Sramanera Jivaka (after the Buddha's physician). Because Sangharakshita refused to allow Jivaka full ordination, and other frustrations with Sangharakshita's management of Triyana Vardhana Vihara, Jivaka turned to the Tibetan branch of Buddhism. He went to the Rizong Monastery in Ladakh. He was reordained a novice monk of the Gelukpa order, taking the name Lobzang Jivaka, and spent his time studying Buddhism and writing. Despite the language barrier he felt at home there, but was forced to leave when his visa expired. His health failed, and he died in a hospital at Dalhousie, India, on 15 May 1962, aged 47.

Writing under both of his Buddhist names, Jivaka published Growing Up into Buddhism, a primer on Buddhist practice for British children and teens, and A Critical Study of the Vinaya, which looks at the Buddhist rules for ordination; both books were published in 1960. Two additional books by him were published in London in 1962: The Life of Milarepa, about an 11th-century Tibetan yogi, and Imji Getsul, an account of life in a Buddhist monastery.

After Dillon's death, his brother said he wanted to burn Dillon's unpublished autobiography, but the manuscript was saved by Dillon's literary agent and published as Out of the Ordinary in 2017.

Works
 Self: A Study in Endocrinology and Ethics (1946), as Michael Dillon
 Poems of truth (1957), as Michael Dillon
 The Life of Milarepa (1962), as Lobzang Jivaka
 Imji Getsul (1962), as Lobzang Jivaka
 Out of the Ordinary: A Life of Gender and Spiritual Transitions (1962; published 2017) as Michael Dillon/Lobzang Jivaka

Notes

References

 
Michael Dillon, The World's First Transsexual Man, Transgender Zone Media Archives.

1915 births
1962 deaths
20th-century British medical doctors
20th-century Buddhist monks 
Alumni of St Anne's College, Oxford
Alumni of Trinity College Dublin
British Buddhist monks
British Merchant Navy officers
Michael
LGBT Buddhists
English LGBT people
LGBT physicians
LGBT nobility
British LGBT scientists
Gender-affirming surgery (female-to-male)
Ship's doctors
Tibetan Buddhists from the United Kingdom
Transgender men
Transgender scientists
ja:マイケル・ディロン